Dorland's is the brand name of a family of medical reference works (including dictionaries, spellers and word books, and spell-check software) in various media spanning printed books, CD-ROMs, and online content. The flagship products are Dorland's Illustrated Medical Dictionary (currently in its 33rd edition) and Dorland's Pocket Medical Dictionary (currently in its 30th edition). The principal dictionary was first published in 1890 as the American Illustrated Medical Dictionary, including 770 pages. The pocket edition, called the American Pocket Medical Dictionary, was first published in 1898, consisting of just over 500 pages.

With the death of the editor William Alexander Newman Dorland, AM, MD in 1956, the dictionaries were retitled to incorporate his name, which was how they had generally come to be known.  The illustrated dictionary had grown to 2144 pages for the 33rd edition.

The dictionaries were historically published by Saunders.

List of products

English-language originals published by Saunders

 American Illustrated Medical Dictionary 
 American Pocket Medical Dictionary (until 1956)
 Dorland's Illustrated Medical Dictionary (currently in its 33rd edition)
 Dorland's Illustrated Medical Dictionary on CD-ROM
 Dorland's Illustrated Medical Dictionary online
 Dorland's Pocket Medical Dictionary (currently in its 30th edition)
 Dorland's Pocket Medical Dictionary on CD-ROM
 Dorland's Electronic Medical Speller CD-ROM (various release versions)
 Dorland's Alternative Medicine Word Book for Medical Transcriptionists (2003)
 Dorland's Dentistry Word Book for Medical Transcriptionists (2003)
 Dorland's Pediatrics Word Book for Medical Transcriptionists (2003)
 Dorland's Psychiatry Word Book for Medical Transcriptionists (2003)
 Dorland's Dermatology Word Book for Medical Transcriptionists (2002)
 Dorland's Laboratory/Pathology Word Book for Medical Transcriptionists (2002)
 Dorland's Medical Equipment Word Book for Medical Transcriptionists (2002)
 Dorland's Gastroenterology Word Book for Medical Transcriptionists (2001)
 Dorland's Immun. & Endocrinology Word Book for Medical Transcriptionists (2001)
 Dorland's OB/GYN Word Book for Medical Transcriptionists (2001)
 Dorland's Orthopedic Word Book for Medical Transcriptionists (2001)
 Dorland's Plastic Surgery Word Book for Medical Transcriptionists (2001)
 Dorland's Cardiology Word Book for Medical Transcriptionists (2000)
 Dorland's Neurology Word Book for Medical Transcriptionists (2000)
 Dorland's Radiology/Oncology Word Book for Medical Transcriptionists (2000)
 Dorland's Dentistry Speller (1994)
 Dorland's Medical Speller (1992)
 Dorland's Cardiology Speller (1992)
 Dorland's Medical Abbreviations (1992)

Translated co-editions published by partners 

In addition to the Saunders titles in English, there have also been numerous translated co-editions around the world. Listed below are the latest translated co-editions of the flagship product Dorland's Illustrated Medical Dictionary, together with the languages for the translations and the names of the publishers:
 Chinese (28th Edition)—Xi'an World Publishing Corp., Xi'an, China
 Indonesian (26th Edition)—E.G.C. Medical Publishers, Jakarta, Indonesia
 Italian (28th Edition)—Edizioni Scientifiche Internazionali (ESI), Milan, Italy
 Japanese (28th Edition)—Hirokawa Publishing Company, Tokyo, Japan
 Portuguese (28th Edition)—Editiora Manole Ltda., São Paulo, Brazil
 Spanish (30th Edition)—Elsevier España, S.A., Madrid, Spain
 Vietnamese (30th Edition)—Medical Publishing House One Member Company Limited, Hanoi, Vietnam

Publisher

Dorland's was published for over a century by the W.B. Saunders Company, which was an independent medical publisher during most of that time. In the 1980s and 1990s, W.B. Saunders was acquired first by CBS and then by Harcourt. In 2001, the company was absorbed into Elsevier, where the name Saunders (without the W.B.) was used as an imprint name. The 2020 33rd edition imprint is Elsevier.

Contexo Media's Dorland Healthcare Information, publisher of Dorland's Medical Directory, appears to be unrelated to Elsevier, Saunders, and the Dorland's family of medical reference works.

See also
 Medical dictionary

External links
Dorland's Medical Dictionary Online – subscription only
Version provided by the Free Dictionary – "The main sources of TheFreeDictionary's Medical dictionary are The American Heritage® Stedman's Medical Dictionary, Second Edition and Dorland's Medical Dictionary for Health Care Consumers [...]."

Medical dictionaries
Medical manuals
Publications established in 1890